The 1996 MAC men's basketball tournament, a part of the 1995–96 NCAA Division I men's basketball season, took place at SeaGate Centre in Toledo, Ohio. Its winner received the Mid-American Conference's automatic bid to the 1996 NCAA tournament. It was a single-elimination tournament with three rounds and the top eight MAC teams invited to participate. No teams received byes in the tournament. Eastern Michigan received the number one seed in the tournament.

Tournament

Seeds
 Eastern Michigan
 Western Michigan
 Miami
 Ohio
 Ball State
 Bowling Green
 Toledo
 Kent State

Bracket 

* Overtime period

References 

1995–96 Mid-American Conference men's basketball season
Mid-American Conference men's basketball tournament
MAC men's basketball tournament